The Joseph Ware House, also known as the Joshua Thompson House and the Ware–Shourds House, is a historic house located at 134 Poplar Street in the Hancock's Bridge section of Lower Alloways Creek Township in Salem County, New Jersey. It was added to the National Register of Historic Places on January 26, 1990, for its significance in architecture, exploration/settlement, literature, military history, and politics/government.

History and description
In 1711, Joseph Ware Jr. (1684–1754) inherited the land and property from his father. According to local historian Thomas Shourds (1805–1891), he built a house here . His second son, Solomon Ware, inherited the house in 1754 and built a one-story brick addition in 1758. His daughter Sarah Ware inherited it in 1765. She married Joshua Thompson in 1773. On March 21, 1778, Judge William Hancock Jr. was mortally wounded at nearby Hancock House and later died here. The judge was married to Sarah Thompson, sister of Joshua. Next, Joshua's oldest son, Joseph Thompson bought the house from him. Joseph's daughter Sarah Thompson inherited the property and later married Shourds in 1828.

See also
 National Register of Historic Places listings in Salem County, New Jersey
 List of the oldest buildings in New Jersey

References

Lower Alloways Creek Township, New Jersey
Houses in Salem County, New Jersey
Houses completed in 1730
Houses completed in 1758
Brick buildings and structures
National Register of Historic Places in Salem County, New Jersey
Houses on the National Register of Historic Places in New Jersey
New Jersey Register of Historic Places